Gratia Christian College (GCC) is a private christian higher education institution in Hong Kong near Shek Kip Mei station. The College was founded by the former head of the Hang Seng University, Dr. Chui Hong-sheung.

Schools and programmes 
 School of Business
 Bachelor of Service Management (Honours) Programme
 Higher Diploma in Transformative Business Management Programme
 School of Psychology
 Bachelor of Psychology (Honours) Programme
 Higher Diploma in Psychology and Counselling Programme
 School of Social Work
 Bachelor of Social Work (Honours) Programme
 School of Early Childhood Education
 Higher Diploma in Early Childhood Education Programme
 School of Christian Ministry
 Higher Diploma in Christian Ministry Programme
 School of General Education
 Diploma in Pre-university Studies Programme

References

2015 establishments in Hong Kong
Educational institutions established in 2015
Universities and colleges in Hong Kong